London to Brighton is a 2006 film by Paul Andrew Williams.

London to Brighton may also refer to:
 Brighton Main Line, a railway line from London to Brighton
 London to Brighton events, events that take place between London and Brighton
 London to Brighton Veteran Car Run, an annual motoring event
 London to Brighton in Four Minutes, an early 1950s BBC film about a train journey
 London to Brighton Way, a Roman road